The fifth season of NCIS: New Orleans, an American police procedural drama television series, originally aired on CBS from September 25, 2018, through May 14, 2019. The season was produced by CBS Television Studios, with Christopher Silber as showrunner and executive producer. This season contained its 100th episode.

Cast and characters

Main
 Scott Bakula as Dwayne Cassius Pride, NCIS Supervisory Special Agent (SSA), later NCIS Southeast Field Office Special Agent-in-Charge  (SAC)
 Lucas Black as Christopher LaSalle, NCIS Senior Field Agent (SFA), second in command
 Vanessa Ferlito as Tammy Gregorio, NCIS Special Agent (SA)
 Necar Zadegan as Hannah Khoury, NCIS SSA and Team Leader
 Rob Kerkovich as Sebastian Lund, NCIS Forensic Special Agent
 Daryl "Chill" Mitchell as Patton Plame, NCIS Computer Specialist
 CCH Pounder as Loretta Wade, Jefferson Parish Medical Examiner

Recurring
 Ellen Hollman as Amelia Parsons Stone, ex-CIA assassin.
 Jason Alan Carvell as Jimmy Boyd, Dwayne's younger, previously unknown half-brother.
 Chelsea Field as Rita Devereaux, Dwayne's girlfriend.
 Shanley Caswell as Laurel Pride, Dwayne's daughter by his ex-wife, Linda Pride.
 Stacy Keach as Cassius Pride, Dwayne's estranged father and an ex-con.
 Amy Rutberg as Megan Sutter's ghost/The Angel of Death
 Derek Webster as Raymond Isler, FBI Senior Special Agent

Guests
 Mark Harmon as Leroy Jethro Gibbs, NCIS Supervisory Special Agent (SSA) assigned to Washington's Navy Yard
 Carlos Gomez as Dan Sachez, NCIS Deputy Director
 LeVar Burton as Rufus Nero
 Mark Gessner as Oliver Crane
 Liza Lapira as Aminta Jax
 Hal Ozsan as Ryan Porter
 Kate Burton as Angela Prescott
 Tom Arnold as Elvis Bertrand
 Erika Ashley as Trauma Nurse

Episodes

Production

Development
NCIS: New Orleans was renewed for a fifth season on April 18, 2018, with a 24-episode order. The season contains its 100th episode. NCIS: New Orleans was renewed for a sixth season on April 22, 2019.

Casting
On August 24, 2018, it was announced that Necar Zadegan would join the cast as Special Agent Hannah Khoury as a new series regular.

Broadcast
Season five of NCIS: New Orleans premiered on CBS on September 25, 2018.

Reception

Ratings

References

External links
 
 

05
2018 American television seasons
2019 American television seasons